Los isleros is a 1951 Argentine film directed by Lucas Demare. It was entered into the 1951 Cannes Film Festival. It won the Silver Condor Award for Best Film.

It was selected as the seventh greatest Argentine film of all time in a poll conducted by the Museo del Cine Pablo Ducrós Hicken in 1984, while it ranked 11th in the 2000 edition. In a new version of the survey organized in 2022 by the specialized magazines La vida util, Taipei and La tierra quema, presented at the Mar del Plata International Film Festival, the film reached the 49 position.

Cast
 Tita Merello
 Arturo García Buhr
 Roberto Fugazot
 Enrique Fava
 Graciela Lecube
 Alita Román
 Cayetano Biondo
 José Cañizares
 Max Citelli
 Lucas Demare
 Aurelia Ferrer
 Salvador Fortuna
 Mecha López
 Luis Otero
 Mario Passano
 Matilde Rivera
 Orestes Soriani

References

External links 

1951 films
Films directed by Lucas Demare
1950s Spanish-language films
1951 drama films
Argentine black-and-white films
Argentine drama films
1950s Argentine films